The C. Buddingh'-prijs (Dutch for C. Buddingh' Prize) is an annual literary award for the best debut poetry collection in Dutch. The award is given by Poetry International and is named after Dutch poet C. Buddingh'. The award was first given in 1988 and the award is given during the Poetry International Festival in Rotterdam. , the winner of the prize receives 1,250.

Winners 
 1988: Elma van Haren, Reis naar het welkom geheten
 1989: Not awarded
 1990: Tonnus Oosterhoff,  Boerentijger
 1991: Michaël Zeeman, Beeldenstorm
 1992: Anna Enquist, Soldatenliederen
 1993: Herman Leenders, Ogentroost
 1994: F. van Dixhoorn, Jaagpad
 1995: Joke van Leeuwen, Laatste lezers
 1996: Henk van der Waal, De windsels van de sfinx
 1997: Pem Sluijter, Roos is een bloem
 1998: Erik Menkveld, De karpersimulator
 1999: Ilja Leonard Pfeijffer, Van de vierkante man
 2000: André Verbart, 98
 2001: Mark Boog, Alsof er iets gebeurt
 2002: Erwin Mortier, Vergeten licht
 2003: Jane Leusink, Mos en gladde paadjes
 2004: Maria Barnas, Twee zonnen
 2005: Liesbeth Lagemaat, Een grimwoud in mijn keel
 2006: Willem Thies, Toendra
 2007: Bernard Wesseling, Focus
 2008: Wiljan van den Akker, De afstand
 2009: Mischa Andriessen, Uitzien met D
 2010: Delphine Lecompte, De dieren in mij
 2011: Lieke Marsman, Wat ik mijzelf graag voorhoud
 2012: Ellen Deckwitz, De steen vreest mij
 2013: Henk Ester, Bijgeluiden
 2014: Maarten van der Graaff, Vluchtautogedichten
 2015: Saskia Stehouwer, Wachtkamers
 2016: Marieke Lucas Rijneveld, Kalfsvlies
 2017: Vicky Francken, Röntgenfotomodel
 2018: Radna Fabias, Habitus
 2019: Roberta Petzoldt, Vruchtwatervuurlinie
 2020: Jens Meijen, Xenomorf
 2021: Wout Waanders, Parkplan
 2022: Maxime Garcia Diaz, Het is warm in de hivemind

References 

Dutch poetry awards
Awards established in 1988
1988 establishments in the Netherlands
First book awards